The 2018 Fuzion 100 Surbiton Trophy was a professional tennis tournament played on outdoor grass courts. It was the fifteenth (ATP) and sixteenth (ITF) editions of the tournament and was part of the 2018 ATP Challenger Tour and the 2018 ITF Women's Circuit. It took place in Surbiton, United Kingdom, on 4–10 June 2018.

Men's singles main draw entrants

Seeds 

 1 Rankings as of 28 May 2018.

Other entrants 
The following players received a wildcard into the singles main draw:
  Jay Clarke
  Lloyd Glasspool
  Alexander Ward
  James Ward

The following player received entry into the singles main draw using a protected ranking:
  Jürgen Melzer

The following players received entry from the qualifying draw:
  Daniel Brands
  Matthew Ebden
  Dan Evans
  Taylor Fritz

Women's singles main draw entrants

Seeds 

 1 Rankings as of 28 May 2018.

Other entrants 
The following players received a wildcard into the singles main draw:
  Jodie Anna Burrage
  Tara Moore
  Katie Swan
  Heather Watson

The following players received entry using protected rankings:
  Bojana Jovanovski Petrović

The following players received entry from the qualifying draw:
  Mariam Bolkvadze
  Victoria Duval
  Marina Melnikova
  Asia Muhammad

The following player received entry as a lucky loser:
  Nadja Gilchrist

Champions

Men's singles

 Jérémy Chardy def.  Alex de Minaur 6–4, 4–6, 6–2.

Women's singles

 Alison Riske def.  Conny Perrin, 6–2, 6–4

Men's doubles

 Luke Bambridge /  Jonny O'Mara def.  Ken Skupski /  Neal Skupski 7–6(13–11), 4–6, [10–7].

Women's doubles

 Jessica Moore /  Ellen Perez def.  Arina Rodionova /  Yanina Wickmayer, 4–6, 7–5, [10–3]

External links 
 2018 Fuzion 100 Surbiton Trophy at ITFtennis.com
 Official website

2018 ITF Women's Circuit
2018 ATP Challenger Tour
2018 in British sport
Tennis tournaments in England
2018
2018 in English tennis
2018 sports events in London
Tennis in London